Polysiphonia fibrata is a species of Polysiphonia that grows as small dense tufted and finely branched marine alga in the Rhodophyta.

Description
The branches of P. fibrate are numerous and much interwoven forming tufts up to 20 cm long. They are fine, terete, cylindrical, erect and dull brownish-red in colour. The branches consist of  a central axis with 4 pericentral cells all of the same length as the axial cells. The branches become corticated near the base. Rhizoids and trichoblasts are abundant.

Reproduction
The plants are dioecious. Spermatangia are borne near the tips of the branches. The cystocarps are clearly shortly stalked. Tetrasporangia are formed in the branches near the tips.

Habitat
To be found on rock, limpets, mussels and on other algae in rock pools at mid-tide and low water.

Distribution
Common around Britain including Shetland and Ireland. Also recorded from Spain, and France.

Note
Other species are similar to P. fibrata and difficult to distinguish.

References

Rhodomelaceae